Nathaniel Benjamin Levi Bar-Jonah (born David Paul Brown; February 15, 1957 – April 13, 2008) was an American convicted child molester and suspected cannibalistic serial killer who was sentenced to 130 years in prison without the possibility of parole after being convicted of the kidnapping, aggravated assault, and sexual assault of various children.

Early life and criminal history
Bar-Jonah was born as David Paul Brown in Worcester, Massachusetts, at Fairlawn Hospital on February 15, 1957, to aircraft mechanic Phillip Brown and housewife Tyra Brown, the youngest of three children. When Tyra was three months pregnant with Bar-Jonah, she was involved in a serious vehicular accident when another driver slammed into the back of her car while she was sitting at a red light which resulted in her having to wear a neck brace for the last six months of her pregnancy. As an infant, Bar-Jonah was described as being inactive and having an insatiable appetite which resulted in him crying incessantly when he was not otherwise being fed. This caused Bar-Jonah to gain so much weight as a baby that he became practically immobile due to his undeveloped muscle tone and his parents struggled to carry him. Later in life, Bar-Jonah declared by his own admission to biographers; "I just love to eat, I can't get enough food, I'm always hungry." He also appeared to be strongly averse to being touched and when Bar-Jonah was only three-weeks-old he experienced water on the brain.

Bar-Jonah and his family moved to Lantana, Florida and stayed there for six years when his father worked for McDonnell Douglas Aviation. In 1964, the Brown family moved back to Worcester, Massachusetts when Phillip became a heavy equipment mechanic at a local construction firm. According to Bar-Jonah, he was frequently beaten as a child by his strict disciplinarian father with a thick leather belt due to Phillip's fear that Nathaniel would grow up to be 'queer' and because Bar-Jonah was a kleptomaniac who frequently stole from his siblings and other children. In late July 1964, before Bar-Jonah moved back to Massachusetts, a then 7-year-old Brown lured a 5-year-old female neighbour into his basement, telling her that he had received a Ouija board for his birthday that could predict the future. Once in his basement, Brown attempted to strangle and throttle the young girl to death, but her screams attracted the attention of Brown's mother, who came to her rescue but Bar-Jonah got off with little to no punishment.

In 1973, at age 15, Brown cut letters and words out of magazines and composed a note that he used to attempt to entice two young boys from Webster to a cemetery, offering them $20 and a surprise. In that case, the mother of the two boys declined to press charges against Brown. She thought it would be best if he received psychiatric help, and felt that he would not receive it through the criminal justice system. During an unspecified date in 1974, in Woodstock, Connecticut, Mary Patrone, 10, was abducted, raped and was released by Bar-Jonah. In late March 1975, a then 18-year-old Brown, impersonating a police officer, abducted 8-year-old Richard O'Conner while he was on his way to school, then proceeded to sexually assault and strangle him. A neighbour, looking out of her window, observed the abduction and notified authorities, who began searching for the boy. A patrol car later observed a vehicle matching that used in the abduction parked far away from others in a parking lot, and after calling for backup, ordered Brown out of the car. O'Conner was found in the car bloodied, having defecated and urinated on himself from the sexual assault, and near the point of death.

A few days before his high school graduation, Brown drove to nearby Hartford, Connecticut, and, again impersonating a police officer, abducted a 9-year-old girl. However, after the child began vomiting and convulsing from the assault, he drove up to a sidewalk and threw the girl out of the car. A nearby witness saw the incident and got Brown's license plate, leading to his arrest. This assault never got back to Brown's probation officer, and he was released from parole in May 1976 for his earlier abduction and sexual assault of O'Conner. When Brown's probationary period was over, he received a letter thanking him for his "cooperation."

On September 24, 1977, Brown, claiming to be an undercover FBI agent, convinced two boys coming out of the White City Cinemas in Shrewsbury, Massachusetts, to enter his vehicle. He then transported the boys to a secluded area, where he handcuffed and then tortured them. After jumping repeatedly on the chest of one of the boys, the  Brown believed he had killed him, then drove off with the other still alive in his trunk. However, the first boy regained consciousness and managed to find help, leading shortly thereafter to Brown's arrest; the other boy was found, still alive, in the trunk. For this crime, Brown was convicted of attempted murder and received the maximum sentence of eighteen to twenty years at the Massachusetts Correctional Institution – Concord but was later transferred and sent for observation to the Bridgewater State Hospital which was a state-operated treatment center for sexually dangerous offender because of sexual fantasies that he had shared with a prison psychologist. At the conclusion of the observation period, he was sentenced to an indefinite term at Bridgewater.

Incarceration and release
On March 22, 1984, Brown changed his name to Nathaniel Benjamin Levi Bar-Jonah. He gave several reasons for changing his name; he told friends and relatives that he wanted to know what it was like to be discriminated against and persecuted as a Jew. During a later 2008 interview with Dr. Michael Stone for the television show Most Evil, he claimed he was Jewish and wanted his name to reflect that. In fact, Brown's ethnic ancestry was Scandinavian and his parents were both active in the Assemblies of God, a Pentecostal movement, and he did not pursue any further connection to Judaism other than the name change.

Later in the same year, Bar-Jonah, along with two psychologists that had evaluated him, won a parole hearing after the two psychologists testified that Bar-Jonah was no longer a threat to society. Superior Court Judge Walter Steele ruled that Massachusetts had failed to prove that Bar-Jonah was dangerous, and ordered him released on February 12, 1991. Administrative issues prevented Bar-Jonah's release until July of that year. During this time, Bar-Jonah confided in his psychiatrists that he fantasized about abducting, murdering, and cannibalizing children. A psychiatrist at Bridgewater was apparently informed by Brown that his interest in torture had long existed and that his primary means of sexual arousal came from the violent thoughts he entertained. Bar-Jonah's previous requests petitioning for his release from Bridgewater were initially turned down because his psychiatric evaluations noted his "violent fantasy life, as well as his risk to the community."

On August 9, 1991, just a month after being released from Bridgewater hospital, Bar-Jonah observed a 7-year-old boy sitting alone in a car outside of a post office in Oxford, Massachusetts. Some witnesses, along with the boy's mother, observed the event and ran to the boy's rescue, causing Bar-Jonah to flee. An officer recognised Bar-Jonah's description from over fifteen years earlier, and he was later arrested for the attack. At first, Bar-Jonah claimed that he entered the car to get out of the rain, but later admitted that he intended to kill the boy. For the attack, Bar-Jonah was given permission by the Worcester County District Attorney to enter a guilty plea to assault and battery in exchange for a two-year probationary period and the promise that he would move to Great Falls, Montana, to live with his mother.

Arrest and investigation
On February 6, 1996, 10-year old Zachary Xerxes "Zach" Ramsay left the apartment he shared with his mother at around 7:34 a.m. to attend Whittier School, taking his usual school route through an alleyway near the 400 block of north Fourth Street. He never arrived at school. Ramsay was wearing a blue denim jacket with green sleeves, a blue football jersey with his last name imprinted on the back in gold letters, stonewashed jeans, and black high-top sneakers. A family of three who lived in an apartment in the alleyway reported seeing Ramsay there that morning, and also reported seeing an off-white, four-door car nearly run him over. Another witness reported seeing Ramsay standing in the alleyway and that he appeared to be "waiting for someone." Yet another witness, who lived near the end of the alleyway, reported seeing Ramsay crying with an upset obese adult male following him a few feet behind at about 7:45 a.m. A witness who personally knew Bar-Jonah reported seeing him standing beside a dumpster in the alleyway at 7:15 a.m. while taking out the trash; he was wearing a navy-blue "police-like" jacket. The same witness also reported seeing Ramsay enter the alleyway later and that Bar-Jonah was still standing beside the dumpster.

Somewhere between where the alleyway cuts into 6th Street and comes out at 7th, Ramsay disappeared and he was never found. School officials contacted Zachary's mother when he failed to report for classes during the day. His mother filed a missing person's report later that afternoon. Detective Bill Bellusci, who investigated the December 1993 case, was assigned to investigate Ramsay's disappearance. Bellusci was given a list of local registered sex offenders by the FBI, but he ignored it and focused his suspicion on Bar-Jonah, who was not on the list. Bellusci requested a search warrant for the property after police made an unsuccessful attempt to access the house where Bar-Jonah and his mother lived together, but he was denied. Bellusci unsuccessfully solicited a new search warrant and shortly afterward, Bar-Jonah moved out of his mother's house.

On December 13, 1999, Bar-Jonah was seen outside an elementary school for the third time in a week. He was wearing a dark-blue jacket and a knit cap, and was carrying two cans of pepper spray, a toy gun and badge. Bellusci and the Attorney General charged Bar-Jonah with impersonating an officer and for carrying a concealed weapon. A judge approved a search warrant on December 15, 1999 for impersonation objects in both Bar-Jonah's mother's house and his new address. Police found two coats, one dark-blue and another with a toy badge in the pocket; a second toy badge; a stun gun; and a baseball cap reading "Security Enforcement". During the search, they also found a pulley on the ceiling of Bar-Jonah's kitchen, two albums with cut-outs of children, a document about knots and bondage and an article entitled "Autoerotic Asphyxia." Police investigations conducted years after Ramsay went missing determined that Bar-Jonah had access to his mother's off-white, four-door 1978 Toyota Corolla the day the boy disappeared, and that his mother and brother were out of town for a funeral. It was moreover determined that Bar-Jonah did not work on February 6 of 1996, nor on the days immediately preceding. 

Two days later, Bellusci was granted a second search warrant for any documents and photographic material. While searching Bar-Jonah's apartment, detectives found a list of fifty-four boys' names called 'Lake Webster' which were later identified as boys from Bar-Jonah's youth in Massachusetts, including three of whom Bar-Jonah was convicted of abducting in the mid-1970s and a "Zackery Ramsey," followed by the word "DIED." Furthermore, dozens of newspaper clippings were found in Bar-Jonah's apartment following the Ramsay case as well as 3,500 photographs of children and undeveloped film containing sexual images of Bar-Jonah and three unidentified boys were also recovered. Authorities also found a pulley on which a rope, cord, or chain could be connected. The pulley was attached to the ceiling in Bar-Jonah's kitchen.

A former roommate of Bar-Jonah described finding clothes in his apartment which appeared to match those Ramsay was wearing the day he disappeared, in addition to bloody gloves. Another roommate claimed that Bar-Jonah sometimes spontaneously brought up the boy in conversations; once a few days before he disappeared and another time when he said that Ramsay would never be found because he had been "chopped up", and the parts scattered in different places. Investigators also found notebooks with seemingly arbitrary characters which were believed to be coded writing. With the help of the FBI, and after months of effort, the writing was decoded; in the notebooks, Bar-Jonah described torturing and eating children; there were also macabre recipes involving children's body parts.

On July 5, 2000, Montana police charged Bar-Jonah with kidnapping and sexual assault, as well as the kidnapping and sexual assault of three other boys, and the murder of Zach Ramsey while Bar-Jonah was held at the Cascade County Jail in Great Falls. Bar-Jonah pleaded innocent to all of the charges. Prosecutors announced they would be seeking the death penalty.

Trial, imprisonment and death
Bar-Jonah was prosecuted for the abduction and molestation of three boys and convicted of kidnapping, aggravated assault, and sexual assault, including charges that he had tortured one of the boys and hung him from the ceiling. Ramsey's mother was swayed by Bar-Jonah's defense team to testify for them that she believed her son was still alive, which led jurors not to convict Bar-Jonah for his murder, although they were not at all convinced he was not an extreme child predator and dangerous sexual deviant. During Bar-Jonah's trial, 36-year-old Mary Patrone recognised him as the man who had abducted and assaulted her by dressing as a police officer in 1974. However, the statute of limitations had expired, and Bar-Jonah could not be charged with the crime. Bar-Jonah was sentenced to 130 years in prison. He maintained his innocence up until his death.

Montana authorities were unaware of Bar-Jonah's criminal record in Massachusetts, a fact that was cited by activists campaigning to force former sex offenders to register. In December 2004, the Montana Supreme Court turned down Bar-Jonah's appeals and upheld the conviction and 130-year prison sentence. 
Bar-Jonah was found unresponsive in his prison cell on the morning of April 13, 2008. He had been in poor health. His post mortem found significant levels of LDL in his arteries and myocardial infarction was the determined cause of death. Despite the objections of Ramsay's mother, a judge declared him legally dead in 2011.

Allegations of cannibalism
Bar-Jonah's earliest interest in the taste of human flesh can be traced to his childhood. Beginning at about the age of 6, he would pick at his scabs until they bled, then proceed to suck on the blood from the wound. His teachers at Webster Elementary School would call his mother numerous times to notify her that her son's habit was upsetting to the teachers and students. When he was incarcerated in Montana State Prison, many of the staff and prisoners observed him perform the same habit. One guard reported that once Bar-Jonah had the scab in his mouth that he "appeared to be having sex." While incarcerated at Bridgewater State Hospital, Bar-Jonah confided in his psychiatrists about his murderous and cannibalistic ideations. One of his therapists noted, "Brown's sexual fantasies, bizarre in nature, outline methods of torture [and] extend… to dissection and cannibalism" and again "express a curiosity about the taste of human flesh."

However, he could have also paid for any groceries using cash or have been well-stocked on food and meat. After Ramsay's disappearance, Bar-Jonah also began to hold cookouts in which he was reported to serve burgers, spaghetti, chili, meat pies, casseroles, and the like to guests. At many of these cookouts, a number of persons told Bar-Jonah that the meat had a peculiar taste to it; Bar-Jonah's response was that he had gone deer hunting and used deer meat in the dishes. However, Bar-Jonah did not own a rifle or a hunting license, nor had he been deer hunting at any time. To one woman, who told Bar-Jonah that she found the taste of his meat to be repulsive, he replied that he had personally "hunted, killed, butchered and wrapped the meat" of the deer. He would later be accused of molesting this woman's son.

During the timeframe of Zach's disappearance, Bar-Jonah held a part-time job in the kitchen at Malmstrom Air Force Base and another at a Hardee's fast-food restaurant in downtown Great Falls leading to speculation that he could have used his position at these two jobs to further get rid of evidence by feeding it to unsuspecting servicemen and women on the military base and to customers at the fast-food restaurant, but there was never sufficient evidence to prove such an assertion. In Bar-Jonah's apartment, detectives also found a number of recipes using children's body parts with contemptuous titles such as "little boy pot pie," "french fried kid," and phrases such as "lunch is served on the patio with roasted child" and "Barbecue bee sum young guy." In the decoded journals, Bar-Jonah also referenced serving these recipes to neighbors. 

During a search at one of Bar-Jonah's previous residences in Great Falls, authorities dug up portions of the garage and sifted through nearly two tonnes of dirt in which they found twenty-one fragments of human bones. Although it was eventually determined that the bones were those of an unidentified African-American child, a boy believed to be between the ages of 8 and 13, DNA analysis showed that the bones were not those of Ramsay and the DNA sample also did not match the human hair found in Bar-Jonah's kitchen. When investigators decided that they wanted to examine the sewer pipes beneath the house in which Bar-Jonah had previously resided, they were told by the owner that the pipes had all been replaced after Bar-Jonah moved out because they were always getting clogged.

References

1957 births
2008 deaths
20th-century American criminals
American cannibals
American kidnappers
American male criminals
American people convicted of attempted murder
American people convicted of child sexual abuse
American people who died in prison custody
American rapists
People from Worcester, Massachusetts
Prisoners and detainees of Massachusetts
Prisoners who died in Montana detention
Suspected serial killers